Christopher Sean Syler is an American-born singer-songwriter, composer and television personality. He began writing his original music since 2007.

Life and career
Syler was born in Brenham, Texas to an American father and a Bolivian mother. Chris moved to Santa Cruz, Bolivia in his early years. His parents enrolled him in a singing group. At age 15, Chris chose the guitar as his favorite instrument. Later he forms his first group in the punk-rock style. Shortly, the band broke up, which allowed Syler to pursue a solo career. In September 2007, Chris moved to Miami Beach and continued his work as a composer, working with many other composers in the Latin market such as: Erika Ender, Wise (composer),  Juan Carlos Perez Soto, Samo (Camila), Sebastian de Peyrecave, Yasmil Marrufo, Mauricio Gasca, Rafael Esparza, among others; Chris manages to increase his catalog as a composer reaching close to 500 songs until 2022.

Syler is also a member of SESAC LATINA.

Currently, Chris is signed to La Soga Records and Imperio Music. His musical influences ranges from John Mayer, Dashboard Confessional and Juanes, Camila. Syler is also a judge on the Bolivian version of The X Factor. His music is available on Spotify.

Discography
Real - 2010
Que No Se Quede Atrás, Vol. 1 - 2011
Que No Se Quede Atrás, Vol. 2 - 2011
Sesion - 2014
Soy (Reloaded) - 2014
Pequeño Show en la Gran Ciudad - 2014
El Año Perdido - 2014
Orgánico - 2015
El Fantasma de Algo Bello - 2015
La Hora - 2017

References

External links
  BUENA MUSICA (SPANISH)
  SESAC
  Facebook page

1986 births
Living people
American people of Bolivian descent
21st-century Bolivian male singers
People from Brenham, Texas
American emigrants to Bolivia